This is a list of mayors of Rockford, Illinois, United States.

One-year terms: 1852–1881
Willard Wheeler 1852–1853
Hiram R. Maynard 1853–1854
Ulysses M. Warner 1854–1855
Edward Vaughn 1855–1856
James L. Loop 1856–1857
William Brown 1857–1858
Seeley Perry 1858–1859
Charles Williams 1859–1864
Albert Fowler 1864–1866, 1867–1868
Edward H. Baker 1866–1867, 1868–1869
Seymour G. Bronson 1869–1873
Gilbert Woodruff 1873–1875
Robert H. Tinker 1875–1876
Levi Rhoades 1876–1877
Duncan Ferguson 1877–1878
William Watson 1878–1879
Sylvester B. Wilkins 1879–1881

Two-year terms: 1881–1937
Samuel P. Crawford 1881–1883
Alfred Taggart 1883–1887
Horace C. Scovill 1887–1889
John H. Sherratt 1889–1891
Henry N. Starr 1891–1893
Amasa Hutchins 1893–1895, 1901–1903
Edward W. Brown 1895–1901
Charles E. Jackson 1903–1907
Mark Jardine 1907–1911
William Bennett 1911–1917
Robert Rew 1917–1921
J. Herman Hallstrom 1921–1927, 1929–1933
Burt M. Allen 1927–1929
C. Henry Bloom 1933–1937

Four-year terms 1937–
Charles F. Brown 1937–1941
C. Henry Bloom 1941–1953
Milton A. Lundstrom 1953–1957
Benjamin T. Schleicher 1957–1973
Robert McGaw 1973–1981
John McNamara 1981–1989
Charles Box 1989–2001, first African American mayor of Rockford
Douglas P. Scott 2001–2005
Lawrence J. "Larry" Morrissey 2005–2017
Thomas McNamara 2017–present

Notes

External links
Haight Village History
Office of the Mayor, City of Rockford, Illinois 

Rockford

Mayors
1852 establishments in Illinois